Metula gigliottii is a species of sea snail, a marine gastropod mollusk in the family Colubrariidae, the true whelks.

Description

Distribution

References

Colubrariidae
Gastropods described in 2005